Claude Maxime Desouches (15 February 1911 – 11 February 2001) was a French sailor. He competed in the mixed 6 metres at the 1936 and 1948 Summer Olympics.

References

1911 births
2001 deaths
Sportspeople from Paris
Olympic sailors of France
Sailors at the 1936 Summer Olympics – 6 Metre
Sailors at the 1948 Summer Olympics – 6 Metre
French male sailors (sport)
20th-century French people